West End Christian School (WECS) is a private Christian school in Hopewell, Virginia. The school mascot is a crusader and school colors are blue, white, and black.

Buildings and structures in Hopewell, Virginia
Christian schools in Virginia
Private K-12 schools in Virginia